Yozgat Blues is a 2013 Turkish comedy film directed by Mahmut Fazıl Coşkun. The film won the Golden Boll Award for Best Picture.

Plot 
Yavuz (Ercan Kesal) teaches music at municipal courses in Istanbul. After his father's death he has to go to Yozgat, a small provincial town. Nese (Ayça Damgacı) joins him on this trip.

Cast 
 Ercan Kesal as Yavuz
 Ayça Damgacı as Nese
 Tansu Biçer as Sabri
 Nadir Sarıbacak as Kamil

References

External links 

2013 comedy films
Turkish comedy films
2010s Turkish-language films